The 2013 Australian Formula Ford Championship was a CAMS sanctioned Australian motor racing title for drivers of Formula Ford racing cars. It was the 44th national series for Formula Fords to be held in Australia and the 21 to carry the Australian Formula Ford Championship name. CAMS filled the role of Category Manager for the championship. The championship was contested over a seven round series which began on 5 April at the Symmons Plains International Raceway and ended on 8 December at the Homebush Street Circuit. It was won by Anton de Pasquale, driving a Mygale SJ13a.

Teams and drivers
The following teams and drivers contested the 2013 Australian Formula Ford Championship. Each car was powered by a 1600cc Ford Duratec engine, as mandated by the category regulations. All drivers were Australian-registered.

Calendar
The championship was contested over a seven round series.

Points system
Championship points were awarded on a 20–16–14–12–10–8–6–4–2–1 basis to the top ten classified finishers in each race. An additional point was awarded to the driver achieving the fastest lap in qualifying at each round of the championship.

The results for each round of the Series were determined by the number of points scored by each driver at that round. The driver gaining the highest points total over the seven rounds was declared the winner of the Championship.

Results

References

Australian Formula Ford Championship seasons
Formula Ford